Holmi or Holmoi, or Holmia, also possibly called Hermia, was a Greek town of Cilicia Tracheia with a harbor, a little to the south-west of Seleucia ad Calycadnum. When Seleucia ad Calycadnum was founded, the inhabitants of Holmi migrated there.

Its site is located near Taşucu in Asiatic Turkey.

References

Populated places in ancient Cilicia
Former populated places in Turkey
History of Mersin Province
Greek colonies in Anatolia